DHN Food Distributors Ltd v Tower Hamlets London Borough Council [1976] 1 WLR 852 is a UK company law case where, on the basis that a company should be compensated for loss of its business under a compulsory acquisition order, a group was recognised as a single economic entity. It stands as a liberal example of when UK courts may lift the veil of incorporation of a company.

The decision was, however, doubted in Woolfson v Strathclyde Regional Council and qualified in Adams v Cape Industries plc.

Facts
DHN imported groceries and provision and had a cash-and-carry grocery business. Its premises were owned by its subsidiary which was called Bronze. It had a warehouse in Malmesbury Road, in Bow, the East End of London. Bronze’s directors were DHN’s. Bronze had no business and the only asset were the premises, of which DHN was the licensee. Another wholly owned subsidiary, called DHN Food Transport Ltd, owned the vehicles. In 1970 Tower Hamlets London Borough Council compulsorily acquired the premises to build houses. As a result, DHN had to close down. Compensation was already paid to Bronze, one and a half times the land value. DHN could only get compensation too if it had more than a license interest. The Lands Tribunal held no further compensation was payable.

Judgment
The Court of Appeal held that DHN and Bronze were part of a single economic entity. Therefore, as if DHN had owned the land itself, it was entitled to compensation for the loss of business.

Lord Denning MR's judgment went as follows.

Goff LJ concurred and read his judgment.

Shaw LJ concurred with both judgments, and concluded with the following.

See also

UK company law
R&B Customs Brokers Ltd v United Dominions Trust Ltd [1988] 1 WLR 321, Dillon LJ suggests that the corporate veil could be lifted to identify a business as a consumer.

Notes

References
E McGaughey, 'Donoghue v Salomon in the High Court' (2011) 4 Journal of Personal Injury Law 249, on SSRN

United Kingdom company case law
Court of Appeal (England and Wales) cases
1976 in British law
1976 in case law
United Kingdom corporate personality case law
Lord Denning cases
History of the London Borough of Tower Hamlets